The 2012 Australian Touring Car Masters Series was an Australian motor racing competition for modified Touring Cars. The series was open to cars manufactured between 1 January 1963 and 31 December 1973 and to specific models manufactured between 1 January 1974 and 31 December 1976. It was sanctioned by the Confederation of Australian Motor Sport (CAMS) as a National Series with Australian Classic Touring (3D) Cars Pty Ltd appointed by CAMS as the Category Manager. The series was the sixth annual Touring Car Masters.	
	
John Bowe (Ford Mustang) won Class A - Outright and Chris Stillwell (Ford Mustang) won Class B - Pro Sportsman.

Calendar

The series was contested over eight rounds.	
	
	
Note: The results for each round of the Series were determined by the number of points scored by each driver in each Class at the round.

Classes & points system
Each competing car was classified into one of two classes.	
	
Series points were awarded on the following basis within each class at each race.	
	
	
	
The driver gaining the highest points total from his/her best seven round results was declared the winner of that class.	
	
Any points scored by a driver within a class were not transferred if that driver changed classes.

Series standings

Class A - Outright
	
	
Note: Points shown within brackets in the above table could not be counted towards the drivers series total.

Class B - Pro Sportsman
	
	
Note: Points shown within brackets in the above table could not be counted towards the drivers series total.

Notes & references

Touring Car Masters
Touring Car Masters